Tyrone County Council was the authority responsible for local government in County Tyrone, Northern Ireland.

History
Tyrone County Council was formed under orders issued in accordance with the Local Government (Ireland) Act 1898 which came into effect on 18 April 1899. It was originally based at Omagh Courthouse but moved to County Hall in Omagh in 1962. It was abolished in accordance with the Local Government Act (Northern Ireland) 1972 on 1 October 1973.

References

County councils of Northern Ireland